Radheyshyam Ramkumar Morarka (26 March 1923 – 28 May 1995) was a member of Lok Sabha from Jhunjhunu in Rajasthan. He was elected to first  Lok Sabha in 1952, from Jhunjhunu (Jhunjhunu & Sri Ganganagar) constituency in Rajasthan as a candidate of Indian National Congress. He was a member of Rajya Sabha from 1978 to 1984. He died in 1995. He studied for B Com at Sydenham College of Commerce in Mumbai and was awarded the gold medal. Member of Public Accounts committee, estimates committee etc. whilst a member of Parliament. he represented the country on various delegations to foreign countries

Personal life 
Late Sh. RR Morarka was born in 1923 in Nawalgarh town of Rajasthan's Shekhawati region. After completing his schooling in Nawalgarh, he went to Mumbai to undertake higher education. While still being a student of the Bombay University, he joined the freedom struggle and took part in the 'Quit India' movement.

Political career 
Though born in a traditional business family, Sh. Morarka was more inclined to social service which led to his joining active politics.

He started his parliamentary career as a member of Lok Sabha in 1952. During the country's first general elections, he contested from Jhunjhunu (Rajasthan) parliamentary constituency on a Congress ticket and won. His popularity can be gauged by the fact that the people of his constituency elected him thrice in a row and he represented them till 1967.

He was the member of the first, second and the third Lok Sabhas, from 1952 to 1967. During his membership of that house, he was a member of the various Select Committees constituted by Parliament, which included the Companies (Amendment) Bill 1953, the Income-tax (Amendment) Bill, the Life Insurance Corporation of India Bill, etc. He was the Chairman of the Public Accounts Committee, continuously for three years, from 1964 to 1967 and was also a Member of the Estimates Committee for two years.

Sh. Morarka was a Member of Rajya Sabha, representing the state of Rajasthan from April, 1978 to April, 1984. During his membership of the Rajya Sabha, he contributed significantly towards the proceedings of the house especially relating to economic and financial matters.

Apart from founding a major industrial house having a strong presence in diverse sectors, he was also instrumental in the launch of many non-profit, social organizations in areas where they were needed the most, i.e. education, health and infrastructure development. These organizations are still making significant contribution to the society. Sh. Morarka also threw his weight in the political arena to ensure that government policies are not just framed and used as an instrument of governance but are utilized to serve the society, and to transform the common man's life.

References

1995 deaths
1923 births
People from Jhunjhunu district
India MPs 1952–1957
University of Mumbai alumni
Rajasthani politicians
India MPs 1957–1962
India MPs 1962–1967
Lok Sabha members from Rajasthan
Rajya Sabha members from Rajasthan
Indian National Congress politicians
Janata Party politicians
Indian National Congress politicians from Rajasthan